Parari, also called Heetan Parari or Hetan Parari, is an ancient village located in Bihar, India.

Education
 Baal Vikas Kendra (Centre for Child Development) -a school

Villages in Buxar district